Zhao Yan  (born 7 May 1972) is a Chinese women's international footballer who plays as a goalkeeper. She is a member of the China women's national football team. She was part of the team at the 2003 FIFA Women's World Cup.

References

External links

1972 births
Living people
Chinese women's footballers
China women's international footballers
Place of birth missing (living people)
2003 FIFA Women's World Cup players
Women's association football goalkeepers
Footballers at the 1998 Asian Games
Footballers at the 2002 Asian Games
Asian Games gold medalists for China
Asian Games silver medalists for China
Asian Games medalists in football
Medalists at the 1998 Asian Games
Medalists at the 2002 Asian Games